The 1995 Chico State Wildcats football team represented California State University, Chico as a member of the Northern California Athletic Conference (NCAC) during the 1995 NCAA Division II football season. Led by Gary Hauser in his seventh and final season as head coach, Chico State compiled an overall record of 2–5–2 with a mark of 1–2–1 in conference play, placing second the NCAC. The team was outscored by its opponents 224 to 157 for the season. The Wildcats played home games at University Stadium in Chico, California.

Hauser finished his tenure as Chico State with an overall record of 24–40–3, for a .381 winning percentage.

Schedule

References

Chico State
Chico State Wildcats football seasons
Chico State Wildcats football